Aramachi Station (荒町駅) is the name of two train stations in Japan:

 Aramachi Station (Miyagi) on the Kurihara Den'en Railway, closed in 2007
 Aramachi Station (Toyama) of the streetcar in Toyama, Toyama